Nothing But the Truth is a British game show that aired on Sky1 and ran from 10 November 2007 to 26 March 2008. It was hosted by Jerry Springer.

Format
Prior to the show, contestants are asked to answer a series of questions while connected to a polygraph, but were not informed of the results. During the show, each contestant is again asked up to 21 of the questions they were asked offscreen. A voice-over, or occasionally the host, announced whether the answer is "true" or "false", based on the result of the polygraph test before the show. The contestant may continue after certain milestones and keep the money they have won so far; giving an answer deemed "false" results in the loss of all the money. The top prize in this version was £50,000.

Transmissions

External links

2007 British television series debuts
2008 British television series endings
2000s British game shows
Sky UK original programming